Notts, Lincs & Derbyshire/Leicestershire 2 East was a tier 10 English Rugby Union league with teams from Nottinghamshire, Lincolnshire and the eastern region of Leicestershire taking part.  Promoted teams moved up to Notts, Lincs & Derbyshire/Leicestershire 1 East and there was no relegation.

The division was created in 2000, along with its counterpart Notts, Lincs & Derbyshire/Leicestershire 2 West, following the splitting of the East Midlands and Leicestershire leagues and the subsequent merging of the Leicestershire and Notts, Lincs & Derbyshire leagues.  After four seasons the league was discontinued following further restructuring and the majority of teams moved into the newly created Notts, Lincs, Derbyshire/North Leicestershire and Nottinghamshire/Lincolnshire divisions.

Original teams

When this division was introduced in 2000 it contained the following teams:

Appleby Frodingham – promoted from Notts, Lincs & Derbyshire 3 (8th)
Bingham – promoted from Notts, Lincs & Derbyshire 3 (6th)
Bourne – promoted from Notts, Lincs & Derbyshire 3 (10th)
Gainsborough – promoted from Notts, Lincs & Derbyshire 3 (79th) 
Horncastle – promoted from Notts, Lincs & Derbyshire 3 (9th)
North Kesteven Old Boys – promoted from Notts, Lincs & Derbyshire 3 (4th)
Skegness – transferred from Notts, Lincs & Derbyshire 2 (9th)
Stamford College Old Boys – transferred from Notts, Lincs & Derbyshire 2 (11th)
Yarborough Bees – promoted from Notts, Lincs & Derbyshire 3 (5th)

Notts, Lincs & Derbyshire/Leicestershire 2 East honours

Number of league titles

North Kesteven Old Boys (3)
Stamford College Old Boys (1)

Notes

See also
Notts, Lincs & Derbyshire/Leicestershire 1 East
Notts, Lincs & Derbyshire/Leicestershire 1 West
Notts, Lincs & Derbyshire/Leicestershire 2 West
Midlands RFU
Notts, Lincs & Derbyshire RFU
Leicestershire RU
English rugby union system
Rugby union in England

References

External links
 NLD RFU website
 Leicestershire Rugby Union website

10
Rugby union in Nottinghamshire
Rugby union in Lincolnshire
Rugby union in Leicestershire
Sports leagues established in 2000
Sports leagues disestablished in 2004